Queen Street bus station is the primary bus terminus in Brisbane central business district in Queensland, Australia. It is underneath The Myer Centre and Queen Street Mall. It opened on 26 March 1988 along with the Myer Centre. At the time it was the largest underground diesel bus station in the world.

Queen Street bus station serves as the terminus of many routes servicing the South East Busway, Southern and Eastern Suburbs and the Centenary / Indooroopilly / Kenmore corridor. It is served by 35 routes all operated by Brisbane Transport.

No Northern Busway services directly connect King George Square busway station with the Queen Street busway station. After stopping at King George Square, a number of inbound services bypass the Queen Street stop or terminate at the Cultural Centre on the southern side of the Brisbane River, and vice versa. However, King George Square and Queen Street are only a short walking distance apart.

The station is divided into several platforms originally named after Australian native animals, but are now identified with letters and numbers: Passengers wait behind automatic doors on the stop that is assigned to their bus.

In June 2015, the platforms were again renamed, becoming numbers.

The station has a portal for buses traffic to enter and leave at the northern end of Victoria Bridge, to connect to the Cultural Centre busway station.

The former entry/exit portal (on Albert Street, facing King George Square), from the Queen Street busway station, was converted into a tunnel so that the station could be connected to King George Square busway station, which opened in May 2008 in the lower two levels of the King George Square Car Park.

Bus routes 
The following bus routes services Queen Street bus station:

References

External links
[ Queen Street bus station] TransLink

Bus stations in Brisbane
Queen Street, Brisbane
Transport infrastructure completed in 1988
1988 establishments in Australia